Listen Up! is the debut studio album by American Idol tenth season finalist Haley Reinhart. It was released on May 22, 2012, by Interscope Records. The lead single, "Free", was released on March 20, 2012. The album is released in two different versions: the 'Standard Edition' has a total of ten tracks while the 'Deluxe/Walmart Exclusive Edition' has four bonus tracks making it a fourteen-song album. The deluxe edition is currently available on Reinhart's official website and Walmart's Internet site. Haley tweeted that the Walmart Edition and the iTunes Deluxe Edition are the pre-order deluxe version from her website. The album has received critical acclaim upon its release and its songs are featured in several critics' playlists. "Listen Up!" debuted at number 17 on the Billboard 200 chart.

Single
The debut single, "Free", reached number four on the US Billboard Bubbling Under Hot 100 chart, and also number twenty-seven on the US Billboard Adult Pop Songs chart.

Reception

Commercial reception
The album debuted at number 17 on the Billboard 200, selling 20,000 copies in its first week. In its second week. it placed number 51 on the Billboard 200, selling 8,000 copies. In the third week, it placed at number 96, selling about 5,000 copies. It left the Billboard 200 after a month in release, only to return again a week later.  The album has sold 77,000 copies in the US as of April 2016.

Critical reception

The album received positive reviews from music critics upon release. AllMusic's Matt Collar stated "Definitely an ear-grabber, Listen Up! ultimately posits Reinhart as a kind of old-school pinup, a mini-Mariah Carey if she'd grown up listening to a mix of Dusty Springfield, Lisa Stansfield, and En Vogue.", and gave the album a rating of 3.5 stars out of 5. He chose the songs "Oh My!", "Liar" and "Now That You're Here" as highlights. Brian Mansfield from USA Today gave the album a positive review, stating "Listen Up! -- out May 22 -- draws heavily on the neo-soul and girl-group R&B of artists like Adele, Duffy and Amy Winehouse. But Haley puts her distinctive twists on the genre, and fans of the Illinois singer likely will be thrilled with the way Listen Up! turned out." He picked the songs "Free", "Now That You're Here" and "Oh My!" as highlights. Rick Florino of Artist Direct gave the album a rating of 4 stars out of 5, and said "Start listening now because Haley Reinhart has made one of the best debuts of 2012, and she might just help revive a little old soul in the process." Barry Walters from Spin Magazine gave the album a 7/10, stating "Thank Adele for an Idol album with depth. Thank Winehouse for dusty soul. Thank Reinhart for the pipes." Grady Smith of Entertainment Weekly gave the album a "B+" grade, and said "With a voice that flips from belt-clear lilt to throaty belt in an instant, Idol's season 10 growler sounds right at home (although occasionally way overproduced) among the blasting horns on her jazzy debut. The disc's retro sound half is a pure funky delight." John Caramanica from The New York Times gave the album a "B" grade, and said "It’s convincing and fresh. In a sense, this is what Cowell’s “Idol” had long been advocating — a return to standards and classic pop modes. It’s unfashionable and a bit out of touch, and what a smart thing that turns out to be."

Promotion

Live performances
Reinhart performed the lead single live on the March 22, 2012 episode of American Idol. She sang the song live for 104.3 MYFM New Music Night. She also performed the single for the March 27 episode of 90210,  Right after, she performed the song on Fox 5's Good Day New York  and appeared on Conan to perform the single on April 24.

Track listing

Personnel
Credits for Listen Up! adapted from Allmusic

 
Masooma Ali- project coordinator
Brian Alvarez- music business affairs
Neil Avron- mixing 
Jeff Babko- keyboards
Tunji Balogun- A&R
Jonathan Berry- guitar
busbee- drums, engineer, percussion, piano, producer, programming
David Calderly- art direction
Fiona Dearing- marketing
Chris DeStefano- arranger, engineer, instrumentation, producer, programing, background vocals
DJ Mormile- A&R
Steve Dresser- editor
John Flaugher- double bass
Brian Gardner- mastering
Charlie Gillingham- Hammond B3, strings
Ainslie Grosser- mixing
Seth Atkins Horan- engineer
Victor Indrizzo- drums
Sam Johnson- trumpet
Gloria Kaba- assistant engineer
James King- flute, alto saxophone, baritone saxophone, tenor saxophone

Rob Kleiner- engineer, producer
Myles Lewis- A&R
Ryan Lipman- assistant, mixing engineer
Steve Lu- strings
Manny Marroquin- mixing
Iain Pirie- A&R
Ginger Ramsey- marketing
Haley Reinhart- vocals & background vocals
Harry Reinhart- guitar
Curt Schneider- bass
Les Scurry- producer
Chris Seefried- bass, electronics, Mellotron, percussion, producer
David E. Smith- saxophone
Harper Smith- photography
Jonathan Smith- drums, engineer
Manny Smith- A&R
Chris Soper- engineer
Chris Steffen- drum engineering
Aaron Sterling- drums
Calvin Turner- bass
Rune Westberg- instrumentation, producer
Ed Woolley- engineer
Joe Zook- mixing

Charts

References

2012 debut albums
Haley Reinhart albums
Albums produced by busbee
Interscope Records albums
19 Recordings albums